Joachim Krug (born 20 August 1955) is a German football manager.

References

1955 births
Living people
German football managers
Arminia Bielefeld managers
VfB Oldenburg managers
Rot Weiss Ahlen managers